The following is a list of Chinese films first released in 2013. There were 273 Chinese feature films released in China in 2013.

Highest-grossing films
These are the top 10 grossing Chinese films that were released in China in 2013:

2013

January – March

April – June

July – September

October–December

See also 
2013 in China
List of 2013 box office number-one films in China

References

External links
IMDb list of Chinese films

2013
Films
Lists of 2013 films by country or language